Jatlan is a town situated in the Mirpur District of Azad Kashmir, Pakistan. It was at the epicentre of the 2019 Kashmir earthquake. Jatlan has many famous landmarks such as the Jatlan Head, which was built during the British colonial period.

Geography 
Jatlan is situated 5 miles from Khari Sharif and less than 90 miles from Islamabad. Jatlan links Mirpur city with Bhimbher and Kotli districts. It is 8 miles from Panjeri and 10 miles from Kalri.   

According to the 1998 census of Pakistan, its population was 2,214.

References 

Mirpur District